The Journal of Infrastructure Systems is a quarterly peer-reviewed scientific journal published by the American Society of Civil Engineers covering all aspects of civil engineering.

Abstracting and indexing
The journal is abstracted and indexed in Ei Compendex, Science Citation Index Expanded, ProQuest databases, Civil Engineering Database, Inspec, Scopus, and EBSCO databases.

References

External links

Civil engineering journals
American Society of Civil Engineers academic journals
English-language journals
Publications established in 1995